Okrąglica may refer to the following places in Poland:
Okrąglica, Zgorzelec County in Gmina Węgliniec, Zgorzelec County in Lower Silesian Voivodeship (SW Poland)
Okrąglica, the highest of the Trzy Korony or Three Crowns in the Pieniny mountain range
Okrąglica, a peak in the Żywiec Beskids